The Black Dispatch (1914–1982) was a weekly newspaper for African Americans published in Oklahoma City. Roscoe Dunjee was the paper's editor. Dunjee was an influence on Ralph Ellison who was a courier for the paper. 

Under the editorial guidance of Dunjee, the paper maintained significant circulation, especially outside of Oklahoma. This caused financial difficulty for the paper as out-of-state subscribers would have been disinterested in advertising targeted to Oklahoma residents. Roscoe Dunjee sold his stake in the newspaper to his nephew, John Dunjee, who later became the new editor for the paper after Roscoe retired in 1955.

References

Further reading
African American Press: A History of News Coverage During National Crises by Charles A. Simmons 

Newspapers published in Oklahoma City
Defunct African-American newspapers
Defunct newspapers published in Oklahoma